Inmara Tibisay Henrriquez Gonzalez is a Venezuelan weightlifter. She competed at the 2012 Summer Olympics in the Women's 53 kg, finishing 10th.

References

  

Venezuelan female weightlifters
1981 births
Living people
Olympic weightlifters of Venezuela
Weightlifters at the 2012 Summer Olympics
Pan American Games medalists in weightlifting
Pan American Games silver medalists for Venezuela
South American Games gold medalists for Venezuela
South American Games medalists in weightlifting
Weightlifters at the 2007 Pan American Games
Weightlifters at the 2011 Pan American Games
Competitors at the 2010 South American Games
Medalists at the 2011 Pan American Games
20th-century Venezuelan women
21st-century Venezuelan women